The Veterans Freedom Party (originally Veterans Federation Party) is a party-list in the  Philippines. It is the electoral wing of the Veterans Federation of the Philippines.

In the 2004 elections for the House of Representatives the party-list got 340,759 votes (2.6785% of the nationwide vote) and one seat (Ernesto Gidaya). VFP was one of 5 party-lists said to have received presidential support in connection with the Garci tapes affair.

Gidaya died on December 4, 2006. Two former candidates of the party contested to replace him, Estrella Santos and Rodolfo Gutang. Gutang is the general secretary of the party.

Electoral performance

See also
Veterans Federation Party

References

External links
 Veterans Freedom Party Official website

Party-lists represented in the House of Representatives of the Philippines